Ero furcata is a pirate spider species with Palearctic distribution. It is notably found in Lithuania  and the Czech Republic.

See also 
 List of Mimetidae species

References

External links 

Mimetidae
Spiders of Europe
Spiders described in 1789
Palearctic spiders